James Horne or Jim Horne may refer to:

 James H. Horne (1874–1959), American athletic director and coach
 James W. Horne (1881–1942), American actor, screenwriter, and film director
 James Welton Horne (1853–1922), Canadian businessman and political figure
 Jim Horne (model) (1917–2008), American model, son of James W. Horne
 Jim Horne (neuroscientist) (born 1946), British sleep neuroscientist
 James A. Horne, Secretary of State of Mississippi 1852–1854
 Jim Horne (Florida politician) (born 1959)

See also
 James Horn (disambiguation)